Molin Forest (Molinska šuma) is a forest located in Nova Crnja municipality in Vojvodina province, Serbia. Until 1961 there was a settlement named Molin. The village was abandoned in 1961 because of groundwater. The Molin Forest is used as a hunting ground.

Banat
Forests of Serbia